Paraburkholderia nodosa is a gram-negative, catalase and oxidase-positive, non-spore-forming, bacterium from the genus Paraburkholderia and the family Burkholderiaceae which was isolated from nitrogen-fixing nodules from roots of Mimosa bimucronata and Mimosa scabrella.

References

nodosa
Bacteria described in 2007